Edward White (1819–1898) was a leading London Free Church minister. He was brother of George Frederick White (1817–1898). He was one of the several Free Church ministers to write in favour of Christian mortalism.

Works
 Life in Christ: A Study of the Scripture Doctrine On the Nature of Man, the Object of the Divine Incarnation, and the Conditions of Human Immortality. 1878

References

1819 births
1898 deaths
English Congregationalists
Annihilationists